American International Corporation was an American investment trust founded in 1915 by Frank Vanderlip; Willard Straight was the key operational leader.  Its board and stockholders included a wide range of leading American financiers and industrialists. With an initial capitalization of 50 million dollars and located at 120 Broadway in Manhattan, its goals were to invest in foreign companies and projects, especially in China & Russia during France and the United Kingdom's fiscal distress caused by World War I.
Its ambitious plans were stymied by opposition from the Wilson administration and the focus of attention on supporting the war effort. Russia fell into civil war and China was chaotic after the death of its leader in 1916.  Willard Straight died and Vanderlip was fired. Despite years of planning, construction work was never begun on the Corporation's elaborate projects in Russia and China. The Corporation did set up a network of branch offices for National City. Its international investments were not profitable and it switched to domestic investment.

References

Further reading
 Mazuzan, George T. "'Our New Gold Goes Adventuring': The American International Corporation in China." Pacific Historical Review 43.2 (1974): 212-232. online
 Scheiber, Harry N. "World War I as Entrepreneurial Opportunity: Willard Straight and the American International Corporation." Political Science Quarterly 84.3 (1969): 486-511. online

External links
 American International Corporation records at Yale University (1917). Reports on iron ore and manganese deposits in South Russia, submitted by American International Corporation engineers Charles Rees and M.A. Neeland.

Mutual funds of the United States